John Fassett Follett (February 18, 1831 – April 15, 1902) was a U.S. Representative from Ohio for one term from 1883 to 1885.

Early life and career 
Born near Enosburg, Vermont, Follett moved to Ohio in 1837 with his parents, who settled in Licking County. He pursued classical studies, and was graduated from Marietta College in 1855.
He taught school two years.

He studied law and was admitted to the bar in 1858 and practiced.
He served as member of the State house of representatives 1866–1868.
He served as speaker in 1868.
He moved to Cincinnati in 1868 and engaged in the practice of law.

Congress 
Follett was elected as a Democrat to the Forty-eighth Congress (March 4, 1883 – March 3, 1885).
He was an unsuccessful candidate for reelection in 1884 to the Forty-ninth Congress.

Later career and death 
He resumed the practice of law.
He was an unsuccessful candidate for election in 1898 to the Fifty-sixth Congress.

Death
He died in Cincinnati, Ohio, April 15, 1902.
He was interred in Spring Grove Cemetery.

Sources

External links 
 

Democratic Party members of the United States House of Representatives from Ohio

1831 births
1902 deaths
People from Licking County, Ohio
Burials at Spring Grove Cemetery
Marietta College alumni
Speakers of the Ohio House of Representatives
Ohio lawyers
Politicians from Cincinnati
19th-century American politicians
People from Enosburgh, Vermont